This is a list of some aquifers in the United States.

An aquifer is a geologic formation, a group of formations, or a part of a formation that contains sufficient saturated permeable material to yield significant quantities of water to groundwater wells and springs.

List of notable aquifers

 Ogallala Aquifer of the central United States is one of the world's great aquifers, but in places it is being rapidly depleted by growing municipal use, and continuing agricultural use. This huge aquifer, which underlies portions of eight states, contains primarily fossil water from the time of the last glaciation.  Annual recharge, in the more arid parts of the aquifer, is estimated to total only about 10 percent of annual withdrawals.
  Floridan Aquifer underlies the entire state of Florida as well as southern portions of Alabama, Georgia and South Carolina, and covers an area of 100,000 square miles. It developed millions of years ago during the late Paleocene to early Miocene periods, when Florida was underwater, and is one of the world's most productive aquifers.
  Edwards Aquifer in Texas is important as a water supply aquifer and the source of major springs. This carbonate aquifer has historically been providing high quality water for nearly 2 million people, and even today, is completely full because of tremendous recharge from a number of area streams, rivers and lakes.  The primary risk to this resource is human development over the recharge areas.
  Basin and Range Carbonate Aquifer, and known by many names, is an important and unique aquifer in that it covers several western states and basins.  Groundwater flows through fractured carbonate rock beneath basins and leads to many regional springs and water features, like Fish Springs National Wildlife Refuge and the springs at Death Valley.  This has been studied in extensive projects like the USGS BARCASS report and is controversial due to water issues like that in Snake Valley, Utah.
  Snake River Aquifer Located in Southern Idaho this aquifer stretches almost to Yellowstone National Park on its Eastern edge all the way to Hell's Canyon along the Idaho Oregon border on the Western edge. Water from the aquifer is used to irrigate over 3 million acres of farmland in Southern Idaho as well as provide drinking water for many Southern Idaho communities.
  Kirkwood–Cohansey Aquifer, is located under the Pine Barrens (New Jersey) of southern New Jersey, contains 17 trillion US gallons (64 km³) of some of the purest water in the United States.
  Mahomet Aquifer supplies water to some 800,000 people in central Illinois and contains approximately four trillion US gallons (15 km³) of water. The Mahomet Aquifer Consortium was formed in 1998 to study the aquifer with hopes of ensuring the water supply and reducing potential user conflicts.
 San Diego Formation, an aquifer used for public water supply in San Diego County, California and Los Angeles, California.
 Turlock Basin, underlies the San Joaquin River in the San Joaquin Valley of central California. One of the largest aquifers in the Western United States.
 The state of Washington has numerous large aquifers, as shown in this map of the Hydrogeology of Washington State.
It provides drinking water for some 700,000 people.
 Central Valley Basin of California, where originates a vast amount of US crops for both domestic consumption and export.  An estimated 2,700 cubic kilometers of accessible "fresh" water remain when deep well sources included in the eight counties of the study, some of which may be polluted by oil activities, some of which may be briny, nevertheless it is larger than the 900–1000 cubic kilometers thought to have been present.  In spite of apparent windfall, ground subsidence, unregulated drilling, water-hungry high-profit agriculture and prolonged drought remain major obstacles to sustainability.   Over a hundred  cubic kilometers are thought to have been permanently lost (compacted clays cannot reabsorb) since farming took off in the valley a century ago, some 10 cubic kilometers were being lost annually both years of 2012–2013 according to GRACE satellite measurements.

See also

Groundwater
Groundwater pollution
Groundwater recharge

References

External links
 Map of Principal Karst Aquifers of the United States

United States geography-related lists